40G may refer to:
 Valle Airport's FAA identifier
 40 Gigabit Ethernet, a networking standard; see 100 Gigabit Ethernet